Daniel Offredi (born 26 March 1988) is an Italian professional footballer who plays as a goalkeeper for  club AlbinoLeffe.

Club career

Early career 
Offredi is a product of Milan's youth system, which he had joined from Lemine in 2000. After eight years at the club, he was signed by Pro Sesto in a co-ownership deal, which was originally set to last two seasons. However, he was reclaimed by the Rossoneri after the first one.

Albinoleffe 
In July 2009, he was transferred to Albinoleffe in a new co-ownership deal for €50,000. He made his official debut for the club on 21 August, in the opening match of the Serie B against Vicenza. Nonetheless, he was able to make only three appearances during the whole season, as he faced competition from teammates Ivan Pelizzoli, Stefano Layeni and Paolo Branduani for a place in the starting line-up. In spite of that, on 3 June 2010, it was announced he had been signed by Albinoleffe on a permanent basis for €50,000; though the deal also involved the co-ownership of youth team player Giacomo Beretta, whose playing rights have been fully purchased by Milan for €1M.

However, less than two months after his permanent signing, Albinoleffe sent Offredi to Reggiana in a loan exchange for the more experienced Luca Tomasig. Following the loan spell, Offredi came back to Albinoleffe for the 2011–12 season.

Triestina 
On 24 January 2019, he signed a 2.5-year contract with Triestina.

Return to AlbinoLeffe
On 4 January 2023, Offredi returned to AlbinoLeffe.

References

External links
Profile at official club website 
Profile at Assocalciatori.it 

1988 births
Living people
Footballers from Bergamo
Italian footballers
Association football goalkeepers
Serie B players
Serie C players
A.C. Milan players
S.S.D. Pro Sesto players
U.C. AlbinoLeffe players
A.C. Reggiana 1919 players
U.S. Avellino 1912 players
S.S.C. Bari players
F.C. Südtirol players
U.S. Triestina Calcio 1918 players